Coralloderma is a genus of fungi in the family Meruliaceae. The genus contains two species found in Asia and Australia.

References

Meruliaceae
Polyporales genera
Taxa named by Derek Reid
Taxa described in 1965